Joseph Alfred Johnson (October 29, 1917 – December 1, 2007) was an American politician of the Democratic Party. He served in the Virginia House of Delegates from 1974 to 1983. Running in the redrawn 6th district in 1982, he lost to Republican John Brown by 46 votes.

References

External links 
 
 

1917 births
2007 deaths
People from Abingdon, Virginia
Democratic Party members of the Virginia House of Delegates
Alumni of Balliol College, Oxford
University of Virginia School of Law alumni
Williams College alumni
20th-century American politicians